Darren Hanniffy (born 1974) is an Irish hurler who played as a midfielder for the Offaly senior team.

Brother of Offaly hurlers Gary and Rory, Hanniffy joined the team during the 1998 National League and was a regular member of the team for just one season. During that time he won one All-Ireland winners' medal on the field of play.

At club level Hanniffy is a one-time All-Ireland, Leinster and county club championship medalist with Birr.

References

1978 births
Living people
Birr hurlers
Offaly inter-county hurlers
All-Ireland Senior Hurling Championship winners